Drosophila sechellia is a species of fruit fly, used in lab studies of speciation because it can mate with Drosophila simulans.

Drosophila sechellia is endemic to (some of) the Seychelles, and was one of 12 fruit fly genomes sequenced for a large comparative study.

Morinda fruit 

Drosophila sechellia are known to preferentially lay eggs on toxic Morinda fruits. Research has shown that a mutation in the gene that inhibits egg production is associated with a reduction in L-DOPA; L-DOPA is a precursor of the fertility-regulating hormone dopamine. Morinda fruits are rich in L-DOPA, owing to their usually insecticidal capacities. Drosophila sechellia fertility is reliant on the L-DOPA found in Morinda fruit, and as a result Drosophila sechellia reproduces solely on these toxic fruits. Recent research found that reduced expression of a newly discovered gene, Esterase 6 (Est6), is an important element of the genetic underpinnings behind the adaptation of D. Sechellia to feed on Morinda fruits.

References

External links 
 Drosophila sechellia at FlyBase
 Drosophila sechellia at Ensembl Genomes Metazoa
 

sechellia